The Kilukeni were members of the Lukeni kanda or House of Kilukeni, the ruling dynasty of the Kingdom of Kongo from its inception in the late 14th century until the 1567 with the rise of the House of Kwilu. The Kilukeni were springboard for most of the major factions that battled for control of Kongo during its civil war.

Etymology
In KiKongo the language of the kingdom of Kongo, the name of the kanda is Lukeni. It is taken from the first name of the founder of the kingdom, Lukeni lua Nimi.  Lukeni lua Nimi ruled around the 1390s before the throne was handed down to his cousins.

History
Beginning with the reign of Nkuwu a Ntinu, a son of Lukeni and the last non-Catholic mwenekongo, the throne passed from father to son.  Occasionally there were usurpations, but the crown stayed within the lineage of the founder until 1567 when a king from the region of Nsi Kwilu, Álvaro I ascended after the last of the Kilukeni died in battle against the Anziku Kingdom.

References

See also
Kingdom of Kongo
Kimpanzu
Kinkanga
Kongo Civil War
List of rulers of Kongo

Manikongo of Kongo